Don't Open Till Christmas is a 1984 British slasher film directed by Edmund Purdom, and starring Purdom, Alan Lake, Belinda Mayne, and Gerry Sundquist. Written by Derek Ford and Alan Birkinshaw, the film follows a mysterious killer murdering Santa Claus impersonators in London during Christmastime.

Plot 
A man in a Santa suit and a woman meet in an alleyway to have sex in a car, and are stabbed to death by a man wearing a grinning translucent mask. During a party, another man dressed like Santa Claus has a spear thrown through his head, and dies in front of his daughter, Kate Brioski. At New Scotland Yard, Chief Inspector Ian Harris and Detective Sergeant Powell discuss the murders, and interview Kate, and her boyfriend Cliff. That night, another Santa is killed, having his face shoved onto the grill on which he was roasting chestnuts on an open fire.

The next day, a present (which reads "Don't Open Till Christmas") is delivered to Harris, Powell receives a strange call from a man claiming to be a reporter named Giles, and a Santa is shot in the mouth. Cliff tricks Kate into visiting a porn studio owned by an old friend, and after Kate storms off, Cliff and the model (who is adorned in a Santa cloak) prepare for outdoor photographs, but Cliff runs off when a pair of police officers spot them, and the model encounters the killer, who lets her go.

At a peep show, a Santa is knifed, which is witnessed by one of the strippers, Sherry Graham. Harris visits Kate and Cliff, and makes it clear that Cliff is a suspect in the attacks, due to being present for two of them. Powell finds Giles digging through his office, and tells him that the newspaper Giles stated he worked for claimed not to know him. Giles retorts by suggesting that Harris is hiding something, and that Powell should keep an eye on him. A Santa is assaulted by a group of teenagers, and runs into the London Dungeon, where he and an employee are killed.

In an effort to catch the murderer, several officers go undercover as Santas, and two of them are butchered at a carnival. The killer then abducts Sherry, intending for her to be "the supreme sacrifice to all the evil that Christmas is". Meanwhile, Harris is taken off the case, and when Kate calls him, she is informed by his housekeeper that he is visiting Parklands, a mental institution. A Santa is chased into a theatre where Caroline Munro is performing, and his body is brought to the stage by a trapdoor after he is stabbed in the face with a machete. Kate tells Powell of her suspicions about Harris (who has no birth certificate) but he dismisses her theories, so she goes to visit Parklands alone, while the killer castrates a Santa in a department store restroom.

Kate is confronted in her home by Giles, who she had learned was just released from Parklands, and is the younger brother of Harris (who changed his surname from Harrison after Giles was committed). Powell telephones Kate, and she tries to answer, but Giles strangles and stabs her. Powell hears Kate's death over the phone, rushes to Kate's apartment, and pursues Giles into a junkyard, where Giles electrocutes him.

Giles returns to his hideout, which he chases Sherry through when she escapes her chains. Sherry knocks Giles over a railing, and when she goes to inspect the body, Giles springs back to life, and begins throttling her. A flashback is then shown, and reveals that decades earlier Giles walked in on his father (who was dressed as Santa for a Christmas party) cheating on his mother with another woman. When Giles's mother discovered this, she and her husband got into an argument, which ended with Mrs. Harrison being knocked down a flight of stairs.

Harris wakes up from a nightmare, goes into his living room, and unwraps the gift he had gotten earlier, which has a previously unseen card that reads "Christmas present from your loving Brother". The present is a music box, which explodes after playing its song, killing Harris.

Cast

Production 

Principal photography began in December 1982 and concluded in early 1984. The film notably had numerous production issues such as conflicts between the producers and director and star, Edmund Purdom. These issues would constantly result in filming dates being delayed and scheduling issues. Eventually, Purdom quit the production and writer Derek Ford was hired to take over the directing but he would be dismissed after only two days. The film's editor, Ray Selfie was then hired afterwards to direct and Alan Birkinshaw was hired to rewrite the majority of the script. Because of Purdom's departure, many scenes in the movie had to be reshot or cut all together (including a key scene featuring the character of Dr. Bridle portrayed by Nicholas Donnelly) This resulted in the recasting of numerous characters since many original actors were not available to return for reshoots. However, Purdom would eventually return to the production to finish directing and reprising his role as Inspector Harris. This resulted in the production using the original ending as written before Purdom's departure.

Alan Lake, who portrays Giles Harrison, committed suicide shortly before the film was released in the wake of the death of his wife Diana Dors earlier in 1984.

Release 

The film was distributed theatrically in the United States on 19 December 1984 by 21st Century Film Corporation, opening in New York City.

Home media
It was first released on VHS in the United States and United Kingdom by Vestron Video. Since then the film is believed to be in the public domain as numerous entertainment companies have released it on DVD.

Vinegar Syndrome released the film on Blu-ray on 25 October 2022.

Critical reception 

DVD Verdict called the film "barely watchable", concluding "there's very little redeemable about Don't Open Till Christmas, but for exploitation die-hards, Dick Randall's productions are always worth watching for a lot of blood, sex, and a few laughs". Hysteria Lives! gave the film 1.5 out of 5 stars, writing: "Words can hardly begin to say how truly bad this movie is! It is a Christmas turkey (with side trimming of cheese, natch) par excellence!"

References

External links 
 
 
 

1984 films
1984 horror films
1980s serial killer films
1980s slasher films
1980s Christmas horror films
British slasher films
British Christmas horror films
Adultery in films
Films set in London
Santa Claus in film
British serial killer films
Films shot in London
Films about kidnapping in the United Kingdom
1980s English-language films
Police detective films
British independent films
British exploitation films
21st Century Film Corporation films
British splatter films
1980s British films